Events from the year 1708 in Russia

Incumbents
 Monarch – Peter I

Events

 Archangelgorod Governorate
 Kazan Governorate
 Moscow Governorate
 Saint Petersburg Governorate
 Siberia Governorate
 Smolensk Governorate

Births

 - Grand Duchess Anna Petrovna of Russia, Elder daughter of Emperor Peter I, the Great of Russia and his wife Empress Catherine I. (d. 1728)

Deaths

References

 
Years of the 18th century in Russia